Onkumbula is a settlement  in the Oshikoto Region of northern Namibia. It is situated on the district road D3603  halfway between Ondangwa and Okongo and belongs to the Okankolo electoral constituency The village has a community hall; a police station is being built. Unemployment is high in this settlement, particularly among the youth.

References

Populated places in the Oshikoto Region